Marvel Ultimate Collections/Complete Collections, Complete Epics and Epic Collections are large full-color trade paperback collections of previously published Marvel comics, typically containing 300–500 pages. The Ultimate Collection/Complete Collection lines collect entire runs of one title, or related titles by one creator. The Complete Epic line collects large crossovers spanning several titles. The Epic Collection line is a numbered collection of sequential issues of one title, sometimes including crossovers from related titles, starting from the beginning of a character. This collection is not released sequentially, as the priority is to fill in periods not covered by previous collections.

Ultimate Collections/Complete Collections

Complete Epics

Epic Collections

Aliens

Amazing Spider-Man

Ant-Man/Giant-Man

Avengers

Avengers West Coast

Black Panther

Black Widow

Captain America

Carnage

Conan

Daredevil

Deadpool

Defenders

Doctor Strange

Excalibur

Fantastic Four

Generation X

Ghost Rider

Guardians of the Galaxy

Hawkeye

Incredible Hulk

Iron Fist

Iron Man

Killraven

Luke Cage

Marvel Two-In-One

Master of Kung Fu

Moon Knight

Morbius the Living Vampire

Ms. Marvel

Namor the Sub-Mariner

New Mutants

Power Man and Iron Fist

Punisher

Sgt. Fury

She-Hulk

Silver Surfer

Star Wars

Thor

Thunderbolts

Venom

Wolverine

X-Factor

X-Force

X-Men

Modern Era Epic Collections

Dark Avengers

Guardians of the Galaxy

Loki

New Avengers

Spider-Gwen: Ghost-Spider

Spider-Man/Deadpool

Venom

See also
 List of comic books on CD/DVD
 Essential Marvel
 Marvel Masterworks
 Marvel Omnibus

References

Comic book collection books
Marvel Comics lines